Marshall Public Schools is a public school district located in Marshall, Michigan. Marshall Public Schools consists of four elementary schools (Walters, Gordon, Harrington, and Hughes), one middle school, one high school, and one opportunity/alternative school.

References

External links
 
 Walters
 Gordon 
 Hughes
 middle school
 high school
 one opportunity/alternative school

School districts in Michigan
Education in Calhoun County, Michigan